Aphidinae is an aphid subfamily in the family Aphididae.

Many species of aphids spread potyviruses and most are from the subfamily Aphidinae (genera Macrosiphum and Myzus). Most have alternative hosts, the primary host plant is usually a tree, and the secondary one is herbaceous.

See also
 List of Aphidinae genera

References

External links

 
Hemiptera subfamilies